Luigi Prato (20 September 1937 – 4 July 2002) was an Italian rower. He competed in the men's eight event at the 1960 Summer Olympics.

References

1937 births
2002 deaths
Italian male rowers
Olympic rowers of Italy
Rowers at the 1960 Summer Olympics
Sportspeople from Genoa